CoinWeek is an American internet-based publication that publishes articles, analysis, news, videos and podcasts about a wide range of numismatic topics. It is one of the leading online publications for coin collectors in the North American market, winning more than two-dozen Numismatic Literary Guild (NLG) Awards since its launch in 2011.

Founding and early history  (2010–2014)

Work began on CoinWeek in 2010 as an evolution of the website CoinLink, founded by Scott Purvis in 1995. CoinLink was one of the Internet's first numismatic resources that connected coin dealers to collectors, presenting collectors with lists and profiles of many of the rare coin industry's leading dealers. As the site evolved, it began to aggregate press releases and news articles from the industry's leading companies and offer collectors original news and editorial content—such as articles by numismatic blogger Greg Reynolds, among others.

In 2009, Purvis conceptualized a new website that would serve as a free daily online coin magazine. He formed a creative partnership with videographer David Lisot. Lisot had previously operated a numismatic video production service called CoinTelevision.  With CoinWeek, Lisot travelled the country, providing short video segments for the website while continuing to produce full-length videos for CoinTelevision. Purvis managed the website and, over time, hired a team of editorial writers that included Al Doyle, Louis Golino, Charles Morgan and Hubert Walker.

CoinWeek grew rapidly and soon won a Numismatic Literary Guild Award for Best Online Coin Website. CoinWeek’s writers and videographer David Lisot were honored by the NLG for their contributions as well.

Charles Morgan period  (2014–present)

Scott Purvis sought to expand the scope of CoinWeek in 2014. Already a daily publication, Purvis envisioned a site that would be a head-to-head competitor to the hobby’s leading print publications. He promoted writer Charles Morgan to the position of Content Manager in February 2014, and then again to the role of editor in July of that year. Purvis shifted his focus to site development.

Morgan saw the need to transform the website into a collector-friendly site focused on education, analysis and the aspirational aspects of coin collecting. He widened CoinWeek’s focus to cover ancient coins (bringing author Mike Markowitz on board for a biweekly series), world coins, modern coins, and the cultural and economic aspects of numismatic history.  In 2015, Morgan brought on Hubert Walker as assistant editor.

At the end of 2014, Morgan began to produce videos, giving CoinWeek two video production teams. Morgan’s videos focused on contemporary numismatic topics (the "CoinWeek Weekly Report") and in-depth educational topics (CoinWeek IQ).

When David Lisot exited the company in December 2015, Morgan rejuvenated CoinWeek’s multi-media offerings, shifting production to 4K and focusing on topics that were more in-sync with the website’s aspirational and educational focus. To date CoinWeek has published more than 1,250 videos on its YouTube channel. One of its most popular offerings is a video entitled "Uncool Coins! - The Tale of the 1850 Double Eagle".

In November 2016, CoinWeek introduced the CoinWeek Podcast, a weekly audio program that presents feature articles, commentary, and in-depth interviews with leading industry figures. The CoinWeek Podcast earned an NLG Award for Best Audio Program for Morgan's interview with "Women on 20s" founder Barbara Ortiz Howard.

References

External links
 
 CoinLink.com (archived)
 CoinWeek Uncool Coins! – The Tale of the 1850 Double Eagle on YouTube

Internet properties established in 2011